Mackenzie Gordon Jr. (1913–1992) was an American invertebrate paleontologist. He was an expert on Carboniferous fossils. Gordon worked for the United States Geological Survey for 40 years, from 1941 to 1981. He was a research associate at the National Museum of Natural History from 1981 to his death in 1992.

References

1913 births
1983 deaths
American paleontologists
Smithsonian Institution people